Mark Holowesko (born 12 March 1960) is a Bahamian former sailor. He competed in the Star event at the 1996 Summer Olympics.

References

External links
 

1960 births
Living people
Bahamian male sailors (sport)
Olympic sailors of the Bahamas
Sailors at the 1996 Summer Olympics – Star
Place of birth missing (living people)
5.5 Metre class sailors
World Champions in 5.5 Metre
World champions in sailing for the Bahamas